Sylvicola fenestralis, the window gnat, is a medium gnat (6–10 mm) of the family Anisopodidae. It is found in the Palearctic.

References

Anisopodidae
Insects described in 1763
Diptera of Europe
Taxa named by Giovanni Antonio Scopoli